Cecilio Apóstol (November 22, 1877 – September 8, 1938) was a Filipino poet and poet laureate. His poems were once used to teach the Spanish language under the Republic Act No. 1881.

He was born in Santa Cruz, Manila and studied at the Ateneo de Manila where he finished his Bachelor of Arts, before studying law at the University of Santo Tomas. During the early years of American occupation  he worked as a journalist for the  revolutionary newspapers Independence, The Brotherhood, The Union, Renaissance and Democracy. His pseudonym on his work at the La Independencia, under Antonio Luna, was Catulo. He later joined the Nacionalista Party which wanted the independence of the Philippines from the United States. He was a member of the Philippine Academy from 1924 until his death. Apóstol wrote in English and Spanish, and composed poems that demonstrated his mastery of Spanish. He composed the poem Al Heroe Nacional (To the National Hero) which is dedicated to José Rizal. In the book of poems, Pentélicas, he described landscapes evoking a vivid image. He died in Caloocan, Rizal.

References

1877 births
1938 deaths
Ateneo de Manila University alumni
19th-century Filipino poets
People from Santa Cruz, Manila
Writers from Manila
University of Santo Tomas alumni
Spanish-language writers of the Philippines
Filipino male poets
Poets laureate
19th-century male writers